Abid Mutlag al-Jubouri is an Iraqi politician and was a Deputy Prime Minister in the Iraqi Transitional Government. A Sunni Arab former major general in Saddam Hussein's army, he rose to prominence during the 1980–1988 Iran–Iraq War.

References

Living people
Government ministers of Iraq
Year of birth missing (living people)